Who's Your Daddy? is an alternate capitalization of "Who's your daddy?", a phrase expressing dominance, especially of a sexual nature.

Who's Your Daddy? may also refer to:

Music 
 "Who's Your Daddy?" (Daddy Yankee song)
 "Who's Your Daddy?" (Lordi song), 2006
 "Who's Your Daddy?" (Toby Keith song), 2002
 "Who's Your Daddy" (Ringo Starr song), 2010
 "Who's Your Daddy?", a song by Benny Benassi from Best of Benny Benassi

Television 
 Who's Your Daddy? (TV program), an American reality television program
 "Who's Your Daddy?" (House), a 2006 episode of House
 "Who's Your Daddy?/Homewrecker", an episode of The Fairly OddParents
 Who's Your Daddy Now?, a Filipino sitcom
 Who's Your Daddy, a 2012 episode of Royal Pains

Other uses 
 Who's Your Daddy? (film), a 2003 film written and directed by Andy Fickman
 Who's Your Daddy? (video game), a 2015 video game created by Joe Dave Williams
 Who's Your Daddy?, also known as Father Figures, a 2017 American comedy film

See also 
 Hoosier Daddy (disambiguation)
 Who's Ya Daddy?, a song by Gerling
 The Jaywalks, formerly known as Who's Ya Daddy